The 	Stanton School, at 5 Lafayette St. in Stanton, Tennessee, was listed on the National Register of Historic Places in 2020.

It was built in 1948 and operated until 1969 as a school for African-American students.

See also
Stanton Masonic Lodge and School, on Main St., also National Register-listed

References

National Register of Historic Places in Haywood County, Tennessee
Schools in Tennessee
School buildings completed in 1948
1948 establishments in Tennessee
Historically segregated African-American schools in Tennessee